This is a list of Coastal Carolina Chanticleers football players in the NFL Draft.

Key

Selections

References

Coastal Carolina

Coastal Carolina Chanticleers NFL Draft